Tarikat is the reissue on double album CD, digitalized and mastered in Belgium, of the double cassette box Diez años de esplendor, recorded and released to commemorate de tenth anniversary of the band.
Vinyl-on-demand label releases the 3LP box 1980-1989 / First decade, including a third LP with bonus tracks, studio and live, and a single record. There also exists a red 'friends edition' box set with golden imprints.

Tarikat track listing
CD 1
 Llamada del afro-poder – 5:55
 Baobab – 5:52
 Autolesión – 4:54
 Francotirador – 4:13
 Alqala – 5:34
 Hasta Tarifa – 7:24
 Brazo armado – 5:06
 Tarikat – 5:11
 Es seguro nuestro porvenir – 6:23
 Macao – 7:09 (not included on the cassette edition)
CD 2
 El resto atrás – 7:20
 Celda de agua – 2:20
 Chile al día – 4:27 (not included on the cassette edition)
 Blanco de fuerza II – 3:38
 Disco-mitrak – 1:29
 Comisario de la luz V – 4:49
 Fel-lah – 4:26
 El frente avanza – 5:39
 Cadencia réproba – 4:42
 Kahba al contrato – 5:03
 Huida – 4:06
 Trabajo y vigilancia – 3:30

Diez años de esplendor track listing
CASSETTE 1 Side A (LP1 Side A)
 Trabajo y vigilancia – 3:30
 Blanco de fuerza II – 3:38
 Disco-mitrak – 1:29
 Comisario de la luz V – 4:49
 Cuarenta años nos iluminan – 5:15 (not included on the CD edition)
 Fel-lah – 4:26
 2-TI-2 – 3:30 (not included on the CD edition)
 El frente avanza – 5:39
CASSETTE 1 Side B (LP1 Side B)
 Cadencia réproba – 4:42
 Kahba al contrato – 5:03
 Trybuna del lavoro – 5:29 (not included on the CD edition)
 El resto atrás – 7:20
 Celda de agua – 2:20
 Huida – 4:06
CASSETTE 2 Side C (LP2 Side A)
 Llamada del afro-poder – 5:55
 Uasat – 4:53 (not included on the CD edition)
 Baobab – 5:52
 Autolesión – 4:54
 Francotirador – 4:13
 Blenoboca – 5:20 (not included on the CD edition)
CASSETTE 2 Side D (LP2 Side B)
 Alqala – 5:34
 Hasta Tarifa – 7:24
 Brazo armado – 5:06
 Tarikat – 5:11
 Es seguro nuestro porvenir – 6:23

Notes
 First edition contains two cassettes in a black box with silver writings, being the name of the band printed in Arabic too.
 The track “Baobab” is titled “Boabab” in these editions by print error, according to the Spanish authors society SGAE repertory.
 The third vinyl of the 3LP box includes: 'Avance rápido', 'Fungus cerebri' (listening link), 'Raskin', 'Primera tundra', 'Trans-Umma', and a live performance from 1987 in Madrid. The single 7" contains three tracks: 'Moscú está helado' (video link), 'Chile al día' and 'Macao'.

1990 albums
Esplendor Geométrico albums